ISO 3166-2:PR is the entry for Puerto Rico in ISO 3166-2, part of the ISO 3166 standard published by the International Organization for Standardization (ISO), which defines codes for the names of the principal subdivisions (e.g., provinces or states) of all countries coded in ISO 3166-1.

Currently no ISO 3166-2 codes are defined in the entry for Puerto Rico.

Puerto Rico, an outlying area of the United States, is officially assigned the ISO 3166-1 alpha-2 code . Moreover, it is also assigned the ISO 3166-2 code  under the entry for the United States.

See also
 Municipalities of Puerto Rico

External links
 ISO Online Browsing Platform: PR
 Municipalities of Puerto Rico, Statoids.com

2:PR
Geography of Puerto Rico